The men's field hockey tournament at the 1968 Summer Olympics was the 11th edition of the field hockey event for men at the Summer Olympics. It took place over a fourteen-day period beginning on 13 October, and culminated with the medal finals on 26 October. All games were played at the Municipal Stadium in Mexico City, Mexico.

Pakistan won the gold medal for the second time after defeating Australia 2–1 in the final. Defending champions India won the bronze medal after defeating West Germany 2–1.

Competition schedule

Squads

Results

Preliminary round

Pool A

1 The match was abandoned in the 55th minute with the score 0-0 after the Japanese team laid down their sticks and walked off the pitch to protest the awarding of a penalty stroke to India. India were awarded the match 5-0.

Pool B

 – Australia and Kenya finished on equal points at the conclusion of the pool stage, resulting in a match to determine second place in the pool.

Second place play-off

Classification round

Eighth to sixteenth place classification

Fifteenth place game

Thirteenth place game

Eleventh place game

Ninth place game

Fifth to eighth place classification

5–8th place-semifinals

Seventh place game

Fifth place game

Medal round

Semi-finals

Bronze-medal match

Gold-medal match

Final standings

Medalists

Sources
 Official Olympic Report

References

Field hockey at the 1968 Summer Olympics
Field hockey at the Summer Olympics
1968 Summer Olympics events
Summer Olympics
1968 Summer Olympics